The Dot was a portable computer released by Computer Devices, Inc., in April 1983.

Specifications
The Dot's primary microprocessor was an Intel 8088, although customers could have optionally purchased a Z80 expansion board that allowed it to run CP/M. It otherwise featured 32 KB of RAM stock (expandable to 704 KB); a 9-inch-wide, 5-inch-tall CRT monitor; and one 3.5-inch floppy disk drive (manufactured by Sony, inventors of that format). The computer was optioned with MS-DOS as a native operating system; a dual serial port card; a second 3.5-inch floppy drive; a thermal printer that attaches to the top of the computer; a 300/1200-baud modem; and an Intel 8087 floating-point co-processor. The video card supports rendering graphics at pixel resolutions of 640 by 200 or 1024 by 248, while the optional thermal printer can output 132-line text, for a perfect facsimile of the computer's text display mode.

Release and market failure
The Dot was announced in fall 1982 and released in April 1983, the company establishing a national dealer network the month prior to release. The Dot was intended to be the breakout microcomputer product for Computer Devices, Inc., who was previously a successful manufacturer of computer terminals based out of Burlington, Massachusetts. Despite possessing the same Intel 8088 as the IBM PC as well as being shipped with MS-DOS (functionally equivalent to IBM's PC DOS), the Dot was not fully IBM PC compatible. Demand for the Dot was low, and by December 1983 only between 2,000 and 3,000 units had been sold. Computer Devices announced two massive layoffs in the wake of the computer's failure and other complications in the company, the first in August 1983, the second in October 1983. Computer Devices filed for Chapter 11 bankruptcy the following month.

The Dot's failure and Computer Device's bankruptcy were highly publicized at the time, as it came amid a slew of other concurrent bankruptcy filings from other high-tech companies—not least of which was that of Osborne Computer Corporation, another portable computer manufacturer whose Osborne 1 was the first commercially successful portable computer ever made. Unlike Osborne, however, Computer Devices was able to survive their bankruptcy and continue into the next decade, albeit making a pivot into software development for specialized applications. The company eventually dissolved in October 1998.

References

Computer-related introductions in 1983
X86-based computers